Elections to Manchester Council were held on Thursday, 2 May 2002. One third of the council - alongside a vacancy in Moss Side - was up for election, with each successful candidate to serve a two-year term of office, expiring in 2004, due to the boundary changes and 'all-out' elections due to take place in that year. The Independent Labour candidates stood as "Independent Progressive Labour". Overall turnout rose to 24.4% and the Labour Party retained overall control of the Council.

Election result

After the election, the composition of the council was as follows:

Ward results

Ardwick

Baguley

Barlow Moor

Benchill

Beswick and Clayton

Blackley

Bradford

Brooklands

Burnage

Central

Charlestown

Cheetham

Chorlton

Crumpsall

Didsbury

Fallowfield

Gorton North

Gorton South

Harpurhey

Hulme

Levenshulme

Lightbowne

Longsight

Moss Side

Moston

Newton Heath

Northenden

Old Moat

Rusholme

Sharston

Whalley Range

Withington

Woodhouse Park

By-election between 2002 and 2003

References

2002 English local elections
2002
2000s in Manchester